Dorota Brzozowska (born 6 August 1964) is a Polish butterfly swimmer. She competed in two events at the 1980 Summer Olympics.

References

External links
 

1964 births
Living people
Polish female butterfly swimmers
Olympic swimmers of Poland
Swimmers at the 1980 Summer Olympics
Sportspeople from Szczecin